Sergio César Alejandro Jáuregui Robles (born 6 October 1961) is a Mexican lawyer and politician affiliated with the National Action Party. As of 2014 he served as Senator of the LVIII and LIX Legislatures of the Mexican Congress representing Coahuila and as Deputy of the LV and LVII Legislatures.

References

1961 births
Living people
Politicians from Torreón
20th-century Mexican lawyers
Members of the Senate of the Republic (Mexico)
Members of the Chamber of Deputies (Mexico)
National Action Party (Mexico) politicians
21st-century Mexican politicians
Monterrey Institute of Technology and Higher Education alumni